Roy Stanley Emerson  (born 3 November 1936) is an Australian former tennis player who won 12 Grand Slam singles titles and 16 Grand Slam doubles titles, for a total of 28 Grand Slam titles. All of his singles Grand Slam victories and 14 of his Grand Slam doubles victories were achieved before the open era began in 1968. He is the only male player to have completed a career Grand Slam (winning titles at all four Grand Slam events) in both singles and doubles, and the first of four male players to complete a double career Grand Slam in singles (later followed by Rod Laver, Novak Djokovic, and Rafael Nadal). His 28 major titles are the all-time record for a male player. He was ranked world No. 1 amateur in 1961 by Ned Potter, 1964 by Potter, Lance Tingay  and an Ulrich Kaiser panel of 14 experts and 1965 by Tingay, Joseph McCauley, Sport za Rubezhom and an Ulrich Kaiser panel of 16 experts.

Emerson was the first male player to win 12 singles majors. He held that record for 30 years until it was passed by Pete Sampras in 2000. He also held the record of six Australian Open men's singles titles until 2019 when Novak Djokovic won his seventh title. Emerson won five of those titles consecutively (1963–67), a still-standing record. Emerson is one of only five tennis players ever to win multiple slam sets in two disciplines.Emerson was a member of a record eight Davis Cup–winning teams between 1959 and 1967. Unlike several of his contemporaries, he chose to remain an amateur player and did not turn pro during the pre-Open Era.

Biography
Emerson was born on a farm in Blackbutt, Queensland. His family later moved to Brisbane and he received better tennis instruction after attending Brisbane Grammar School and Ipswich Grammar School.

Emerson won his first Grand Slam tournament doubles title in 1959 at Wimbledon (partnering Neale Fraser). In 1961, he captured his first Grand Slam tournament singles title at the Australian Championships, beating compatriot Rod Laver in four sets in the final. Later that year, Emerson claimed his second major singles crown when he again beat Laver in the final of the US Championships.

Known as "Emmo" on the tour, the six-foot right-hander was known for training hard and always being ready for strenuous matches because of his outstanding level of fitness. He was primarily a serve-and-volley style player, but was also able to adapt to the rigours of slow courts, allowing him to enjoy success on all surfaces.

From 1963 to 1967, Emerson won five consecutive men's singles titles at the Australian Championships. His record of six Australian men's singles crowns was surpassed in 2019 by Novak Djokovic who won his record seventh.

1963 also saw Emerson capture his first French Championships singles title, beating Pierre Darmon in the final.

Emerson's first Wimbledon singles title came in 1964, with a final victory over Fred Stolle. Emerson won 55 consecutive matches during 1964 and finished the year with 109 victories out of 115 matches. He won three of the year's four Grand Slam events that year (failing to win only the French Open).

During his amateur career Emerson received several offers to turn professional, including an £38,000 offer made at the end of 1964 by Jack Kramer, but declined and opted to remain an amateur.
In 1966, Emerson rejected a $100,000 guarantee over two years offer to turn pro, stating that he "couldn't afford to take a pay cut." It was estimated that Emerson and Santana were paid about $1,000 to $1,500 a week in living expenses alone from their national tennis associations as "shamateurs".

Emerson was the world No. 1 amateur player in 1964 and 1965 according to Lance Tingay of The Daily Telegraph and in 1961 and 1964 according to Ned Potter of World Tennis. In 1965, he successfully defended his Australian and Wimbledon singles crowns. He was the heavy favourite to win Wimbledon again in 1966, but during his fourth round match he skidded while chasing the ball and crashed into the umpire's stand, injuring his shoulder. He still finished the match, but was unable to win.

Emerson's last major singles title came at the French Championships in 1967 – the year before the open era began. His 12 major singles titles stood as a men's record until 2000, when it was surpassed by Pete Sampras. Emerson signed a professional contract with the National Tennis League in early April 1968.

Emerson had 10 straight victories in Grand Slam tournament finals in which he appeared, which is an all-time record.

Emerson's final Grand Slam doubles title was won in 1971 at Wimbledon (partnering Laver). His 16 Grand Slam doubles crowns were won with five different partners. From 1960 to 1965, he won six consecutive French Open men's doubles titles. Jack Kramer, the long-time tennis promoter and tennis great, writes in his 1979 autobiography that "Emerson was the best doubles player of all the moderns, very possibly the best forehand court player of all time. He was so quick he could cover everything. He had the perfect doubles shot, a backhand that dipped over the net and came in at the server's feet as he moved to the net. Gene Mako and Johnny van Ryn could hit a shot like that sometimes, but never so often nor as proficiently as Emerson."

Emerson was also a member of a record eight Davis Cup winning teams between 1959 and 1967.

Emerson's 12 singles and 16 doubles titles make him one of the leading players in Grand Slam tournament history.

Emerson's last top-20 ranking was in 1973, primarily owing to his winning his 105th and final career title at the Pacific Coast Championships in San Francisco. He defeated Roscoe Tanner, Arthur Ashe, and Björn Borg in the last three rounds of that tournament. Emerson played just a few tournaments through 1977. His last appearance was in the Gstaad, Switzerland tournament in 1983.

Although he exited the tournament circuit, Emerson did not retire. In the late 1970s, he served as a player/coach for the Boston Lobsters in World Team Tennis (WTT). He mostly played doubles with the Lobsters and often teamed with fellow Australian Tony Roche. In the 1978 season, the last season under the original iteration of World Team Tennis, Roy coached the Lobsters to the Eastern Division Championship and into the WTT Finals against the Los Angeles Strings. The final Lobster team that Emerson coached consisted of Tony Roche, Mike Estep (for part of the season), and Emerson himself as the male players.

Emerson now resides in Newport Beach, California with his wife, Joy, and daughter, Heidi, and has a home in Gstaad where he holds a tennis clinic each summer. His son, Antony, was an All-American in tennis at Corona del Mar High School and the University of Southern California and played on the professional tour briefly. Roy and Antony won the United States Hard Court Father-and-Son title in 1978. Roy briefly coached promising juniors at East Lake Woodlands in Oldsmar, Florida.

Awards and honours
Emerson was inducted into the International Tennis Hall of Fame in 1982 and the Sport Australia Hall of Fame in 1986. The main court for the Suisse Open Gstaad, a tournament which Emerson won five times and where he played his last match as a professional, is named Roy Emerson Arena in his honour.

In 2000, he was awarded the Australian Sports Medal, and in 2001 received the Centenary Medal.

The Roy Emerson trophy, which is awarded to the male champion at the Brisbane International, is named in his honour. In 2009 Emerson was inducted into the Queensland Sport Hall of Fame. He was honoured during the 2013 Australian Open at the Australian Open Legends' Lunch.

In 2014, the Brisbane City Council named the new tennis centre in Milton at Frew Park after Roy Emerson. The same year at Blackbutt, the Roy Emerson Museum was opened by Roy Emerson. On the 18 January 2017, a statue of Roy Emerson was unveiled at the Blackbutt Museum.

Place in history
In the Tennis Channel series "100 Greatest of All Time" in 2012, Emerson was ranked the 11th greatest male tennis player of all time, and the second highest rated Australian in the series, behind Rod Laver.

Grand Slam tournament finals

Singles: 15 (12 titles, 3 runners–up)

Doubles: 28 (16 titles, 12 runners–up)

Mixed doubles: 2 (runners–up)

Grand Slam tournament performance timeline

Singles

Open-Era doubles titles (20)

Notes

References

Sources
 
 World of Tennis Yearbook 1971 (1971), by John Barrett, London

See also

 World number one male tennis player rankings
 Tennis male players statistics
 All-time tennis records – men's singles
 Tennis records of the Open Era – men's singles

External links

 
 
 
 
 

 

1936 births
Living people
Australian Championships (tennis) champions
Australian expatriate sportspeople in the United States
Australian male tennis players
Australian Open (tennis) champions
French Championships (tennis) champions
French Championships junior (tennis) champions
Grand Slam (tennis) champions in men's singles
Grand Slam (tennis) champions in men's doubles
Sportspeople from Newport Beach, California
People from Wide Bay–Burnett
International Tennis Hall of Fame inductees
Sport Australia Hall of Fame inductees
Tennis people from Queensland
United States National champions (tennis)
Wimbledon champions
Wimbledon champions (pre-Open Era)
Companions of the Order of Australia
Recipients of the Australian Sports Medal
Recipients of the Centenary Medal
Grand Slam (tennis) champions in boys' singles
Grand Slam (tennis) champions in boys' doubles
World number 1 ranked male tennis players